Capys bamptoni is a butterfly in the family Lycaenidae. It is found in Sudan (the Imatong and Didinga mountains).

References

Endemic fauna of Sudan
Butterflies described in 1988
Capys (butterfly)